France is a studio album by French singer France Gall, released in March 1996.

Track listing

Notes

Personnel 
Michael Mishaw - background vocals
Bernadette Barlow - background vocals

Certifications

References

External links 
 France Gall – France at Discogs

France Gall albums
Albums produced by Michel Berger
Albums produced by Marcus Miller
Warner Records albums
1996 albums